Sem Steijn (born 17 November 2001) is a Dutch professional footballer who plays as a midfielder for Twente.

Club career
Steijn is a youth product of SV KMD and ADO Den Haag. On 27 July 2018, he signed his first professional contract with ADO Den Haag, and was subsequently loaned to VVV-Venlo. He made his professional debut for VVV in a 4–1 Eredivisie loss to Feyenoord on 6 December 2018. In doing so, he became the youngest ever Eredivisie debutant from VVV.

On 8 March 2022, Steijn signed with Twente, officially joining them from 1 July.

Personal life
Steijn is the son of Maurice Steijn, who is a Dutch former footballer and current manager of Sparta Rotterdam.

References

External links
 
 
 Career stats & Profile - Voetbal International

Living people
2001 births
Footballers from The Hague
Association football midfielders
Dutch footballers
VVV-Venlo players
ADO Den Haag players
Al Wahda FC players
FC Twente players
Eredivisie players
Eerste Divisie players
Derde Divisie players